The 2019–20 season was Hamilton's sixth consecutive season in the top flight of Scottish football since their promotion at the end of the 2013–14 season. Hamilton also competed in the League Cup and the Scottish Cup.

Summary

Season
On 13 March 2020, the Scottish football season was suspended with immediate effect due to the COVID-19 Coronavirus outbreak. On 9 April, the Scottish football season was further suspended until at least 10 June. On 18 May 2020, the SPFL declared the end of the season determining on an average points per game with Accies finishing in eleventh place and surviving for another season.

Results and fixtures

Scottish Premiership

Scottish League Cup

Group stage

Knockout phase

Scottish Cup

Squad statistics

Appearances
As of 7 March 2020

|-
|colspan="10"|Players who left the club during the 2018–19 season
|-

|}

Team statistics

League table

League Cup table

Transfers

In

Out

References

Hamilton Academical F.C. seasons
Hamilton Academical